The Baghban are a Muslim community found in North India and in Pakistan.

Baghban may also refer to:
 Baghban (1938 film), a Hindi/Urdu family drama
 Baghban (2003 film), an Indian Hindi drama film